Robert Leon Brace (19 December 1964) was an English professional footballer who played for Tottenham Hotspur and German club 1. FC Saarbrucken.

Playing career
Brace joined Tottenham Hotspur as an apprentice in December 1982. The forward made one first team appearance for the Lilywhites on 7 May 1984 at Southampton in a match that ended in a 5–0 defeat for Tottenham–their biggest defeat at The Dell. Brace went on to play 44 matches for 1. FC Saarbrucken and scoring nine goals for the German club between 1986 and 1988.

Post–football career
Today, Brace works at the Mercedes Benz plant at Koblenz, and, in addition coaches the local football team; TuS Immendorf.

References

1964 births
Living people
Footballers from Edmonton, London
English footballers
English expatriate footballers
English Football League players
Tottenham Hotspur F.C. players
1. FC Saarbrücken players
K.R.C. Genk players
De Graafschap players
SV Eintracht Trier 05 players
TuS Koblenz players
2. Bundesliga players
Association football forwards
FK Pirmasens players